The Ambala Lok Sabha constituency is one of the 10 Lok Sabha (parliamentary) constituencies in the Haryana state in northern India. This constituency covers the entire Panchkula and Ambala districts and part of Yamunanagar district. It is reserved for the Scheduled caste candidates.

Assembly segments
Ambala Lok Sabha constituency comprises nine Vidhan Sabha (legislative assembly) constituencies. These are:

Members of Parliament

Election results

Notes

References

See also
 Ambala district
 List of Constituencies of the Lok Sabha

Lok Sabha constituencies in Haryana
Ambala district
Panchkula district
Yamunanagar district